Jadson Viera Castro or simply Jadson (born 4 August 1981) is an Uruguayan retired football defender born in Brazil and current football coach. He is currently the assistant coach of Talleres.

Biography 
Jadson was born in Santana do Livramento, a city located in the south of the Brazilian state of Rio Grande do Sul, along the border with the Uruguayan city of Rivera.

Jadson started his professional career in 2001 with  Danubio in Uruguay, during his time with the club he has helped them to win 2 Apertura, 3 Clausura and 2 overall Uruguayan league championships.

Jadson spent part of 2005 on loan to Atlante in Mexico before returning to Uruguay in 2006.

After helping Danubio to claim the overall league championship in 2007, Jadson moved to Argentina to join Club Atlético Lanús where he helped the club to win the Apertura 2007 tournament, their first ever top flight league title.

In July 2010, he signed with Vasco da Gama.

Coaching career
After retiring, Viera was appointed assistant coach at Nacional under manager Alexander Medina. The duo left the club at the end of the year.

Viera followed Alexander Medina to Argentina club Talleres de Córdoba in June 2019.

Minor titles

National titles

References

External links
 Player profile on the Lanús website 
 Argentine Primera statistics at Fútbol XXI  
 Argentine Primera statistics 
 Jadson Viera at Soccerway

1981 births
Living people
Brazilian footballers
Brazilian expatriate footballers
Argentine Primera División players
Uruguayan Primera División players
Liga MX players
Danubio F.C. players
Atlante F.C. footballers
Club Atlético Lanús footballers
CR Vasco da Gama players
Club Nacional de Football players
C.A. Rentistas players
Association football defenders
Expatriate footballers in Argentina
Expatriate footballers in Uruguay
Expatriate footballers in Mexico
Brazilian expatriate sportspeople in Argentina
Brazilian expatriate sportspeople in Uruguay
Brazilian expatriate sportspeople in Mexico